Provincetown Printers was an art colony in Provincetown, Massachusetts during the early 20th-century of artists who created art using woodblock printing techniques. It was the first group of its kind in the United States, developed in an area when European and American avant-garde artists visited in number after World War I. The "Provincetown Print", a white-line woodcut print, was attributed to this group. Bror Julius Olsson Nordfeldt is credited with developing the technique, based upon Japanese ukiyo-e woodblock printing, though there is evidence that a lesser-known Provincetown artist, Edith Lake Wilkinson, was making white-line prints in 1914, a year earlier than Nordfeldt's first known efforts. Blanche Lazzell is said to have mastered the technique. Rather than creating separate woodblocks for each color, one block was made and painted. Small groves between the elements of the design created the white line. Because the artists often used soft colors, they sometimes have the appearance of a watercolor painting.

Early artists in the group included Ethel Mars, Ada Gilmore, Mildred McMillen, Maud Hunt Squire, Juliette Nichols and Bror Julius Olsson Nordfeldt. Other artists included William Zorach, Ferol Sibley Warthen, Blanche Lazzell, Karl Knaths, and Agnes Weinrich. Edna Boies Hopkins, a friend of Squires and Mars from the Art Academy of Cincinnati, also visited the community.

Bill Evaul, a writer for Print Review in the late 1970s, was asked to write an article about "printmaking in Provincetown", but by that time many of the artists were no longer alive. Through research with Myron Stout and meeting with some surviving members, like Ferol Sibley Warthen, he learned the history about the Provincetown Print and later learned how to create works of art with the technique. Since then, he has promoted the white line woodcut technique in his historical research paper "Provincetown Printers: Genesis of a Unique Woodcut Tradition",  taught and lectured about the technique, and has created and shown his version of the Provincetown Prints in exhibits.

An exhibit of 75 works of art from this group was held at the Smithsonian American Art Museum from September 9, 1983 to January 8, 1984.

See also
 Provincetown Art Association and Museum
 Ella Sophonisba Hergesheimer
 Mary Tannahill
 Anna Heyward Taylor

References

External links
 How to make a Provincetown Print (video)

20th century in art
20th century in Massachusetts
Art in Massachusetts
Artist colonies
History of Barnstable County, Massachusetts
Provincetown, Massachusetts
Woodcut designers